Emmanuel King Sebareme (born 19 December 1995) is a South African cricketer who made his senior debut for Western Province during the 2014–15 season. He made his international debut for the Rwanda cricket team in October 2021.

Personal life 
Sebareme was born in the Democratic Republic of the Congo to Rwandan refugee parents, who had fled the conflict of the mid-1990s. Largely traveling on foot, he and his family arrived in South Africa when he was five years old, settling in Cape Town.

Career 
Taking up cricket, Sebareme began as a medium-fast bowler, but later switched to bowling off spin. In December 2014, he was selected for Western Province's under-19 team at Khaya Majola Week (the national under-19 tournament). There, he took 12 wickets at an average of 14.33, equal with Namibia's JJ Smit and behind only Northerns' Stefan Klopper (14 wickets) and Border's Sithembele Langa (13 wickets).

In January 2015, Sebareme was selected for the Cape Cobras team at the CSA Cubs Week, an equivalent underage tournament for the South African franchise teams. Later in the month, he made his first-class debut for Western Province in the CSA 3-Day Cup, taking 1/34 and 0/2 from a total of ten overs in the match against North West. He had more success in his next three-day match, taking 2/21 and 0/19 against Griqualand West, as well as in his sole limited-overs match to date, taking 1/18 against North West. Sebareme was named in Western Province's squad for the Africa T20 Cup in September 2015, and went on to make his Twenty20 debut in his team's last match of the tournament. Outside of playing cricket, he studies economics at the University of the Western Cape, on a full bursary.

In 2021, Sebareme expressed interest in representing Rwanda in international cricket, for which he is eligible through his parents. Head coach Martin Suji invited him to Rwanda to try out for the team. In October 2021, he was named in Rwanda's Twenty20 International (T20I) squad for the Group A matches in the 2021 ICC Men's T20 World Cup Africa Qualifier tournament. He made his T20I debut on 16 October 2021, for Rwanda against Ghana.

References

External links
Player profile and statistics at Cricket Archive
Player profile and statistics at ESPNcricinfo

1993 births
Living people
Rwandan refugees
Rwandan cricketers
Rwanda Twenty20 International cricketers
South African cricketers
South African people of Rwandan descent
Western Province cricketers
Cricketers from Cape Town
Democratic Republic of the Congo emigrants to South Africa